Jordan Hooper (born February 20, 1992) is an American basketball player. She last played for the Atlanta Dream of the Women's National Basketball Association (WNBA). She was an All-American forward at the college level for the University of Nebraska.

High school
Hooper grew up on a ranch outside Alliance, Nebraska.  As a high school player, she was twice the Gatorade Player of the Year for Nebraska and led Alliance High School to a state title as a freshman in 2007.  In addition to her basketball career, she was also an All-State volleyball player and competed in the long jump for the school's track team.

College career

At Nebraska, Hooper played four years under coach Connie Yori and left the program as one of its all-time greats.  A four-year starter, she led the Cornhuskers to NCAA Tournament berths in each of her last three years (2012, 2013, 2014) – including a trip to the tournament Sweet Sixteen as a junior.  She was named first team All-Big Ten Conference in each of these seasons and capped her career off by being named Big Ten Player of the Year by the league's coaches in 2014.  For her career, she scored 2,357 points (18.0 per game) and collected 1,100 rebounds (8.5 per game).  She became the third player in school history to pass the 2,000 point/1,000 rebound milestone.

In addition to earning conference player of the year honors, Hooper was named a first team All-American by the Women's Basketball Coaches Association (WBCA) and a second team All-American by the Associated Press.  She was a finalist for the Wade Trophy and Wooden Award National Player of the Year honors, as well for the Senior CLASS Award for top senior.

Nebraska  statistics

Source

Professional career
Following her graduation from Nebraska, Hooper was drafted by the WNBA's Tulsa Shock with the first pick of the second round (13th overall) of the 2014 WNBA Draft.  She was named to the team's final roster for the 2014 WNBA season.

International career
Following her junior season at Nebraska, Hooper was a part of the United States team in the 2013 Summer Universiade in Kazan, Russia. Hooper earned her first start in the championship game and delivered. She helped the team get out to an early lead, and ended up with nine points and nine rebounds. She averaged 6.5 points and 5.8 rebounds per game as the team won the gold medal in the tournament.

References

External links
 WNBA profile
 Nebraska profile

1992 births
Living people
All-American college women's basketball players
American expatriate basketball people in Turkey
American women's basketball players
Atlanta Dream players
Basketball players from Nebraska
Beşiktaş women's basketball players
Connecticut Sun players
Dallas Wings players
Chicago Sky players
Nebraska Cornhuskers women's basketball players
People from Alliance, Nebraska
People from Sheridan County, Nebraska
Small forwards
Tulsa Shock draft picks
Tulsa Shock players
Universiade medalists in basketball
Universiade gold medalists for the United States
Medalists at the 2013 Summer Universiade
United States women's national basketball team players